John Blaicher (March 5, 1930 – March 13, 2006) was a Canadian football player who played for the Montreal Alouettes. He previously played football for the Brantford Redskins senior team. He was named an all-star for the 1955 CFL season.

References

1930 births
2006 deaths
Montreal Alouettes players
Players of Canadian football from Ontario
Sportspeople from Hamilton, Ontario